John Birchard Rice (June 23, 1832 – January 14, 1893) was an American medical doctor and politician who served as a U.S. Representative from Ohio for one term from 1881 to 1883.

Biography
Born in Fremont, Ohio, Rice attended the common schools of Lower Sandusky (now Fremont) and Oberlin College, Ohio. He graduated from the medical department of the University of Michigan at Ann Arbor in 1857. He took a post-graduate course at Jefferson Medical College, Philadelphia, Pennsylvania, and at Bellevue Hospital, New York City in 1859. He was a lecturer on military surgery and obstetrics in the Charity Hospital Medical College and the medical department of the University of Wooster in Cleveland, Ohio.

Rice served on the medical staff during the Civil War as assistant surgeon of the Tenth and then as surgeon of the Seventy-second regiments of the Ohio Volunteer Infantry. He was also surgeon in chief of a division in the Fifteenth Army Corps and of the District of Memphis.

After the war, he was appointed a trustee of the state hospital in Toledo, Ohio. He served as member of the Board of Health of Fremont, Ohio.

Congress 
Rice was elected as a Republican to the Forty-seventh Congress (March 4, 1881 – March 3, 1883). He was not a candidate for renomination in 1882. He engaged in the practice of medicine in Fremont. He died in Fremont, and was interred in Oakwood Cemetery. He died from Bright's disease.

Family
Rice was the second son of Dr. Robert Stuart Rice and Eliza Ann (Caldwell) Rice. He was married to Sarah Wilson on December 12, 1861. They had two children named Lizzie, born 1865, and Wilson, born 1875.

References

Sources
 Retrieved on 2009-5-12

External links

1832 births
1893 deaths
Oberlin College alumni
University of Michigan Medical School alumni
People from Fremont, Ohio
Union Army surgeons
People of Ohio in the American Civil War
College of Wooster faculty
Deaths from nephritis
American people of Welsh descent
Jefferson Medical College alumni
19th-century American politicians
Republican Party members of the United States House of Representatives from Ohio